Connor Neil Kazuki O'Toole is an Australian professional footballer who plays as a left back for Western United in the A-League.

O'Toole has represented the Australian under-20 national team on several occasions.

Early life
O'Toole was born in Sydney, Australia to a Japanese mother and Irish father. He has one sister who is a former national figure skater. He attended Seiritsu Gakuen High School in Tokyo, Japan for three years.

Playing career

Club
In November 2015, O'Toole was named in the Adelaide United youth team squad for the 2015–16 National Youth League.

O'Toole signed for A-League club Brisbane Roar in May 2016 on a two-year professional deal along with fellow young defender Kye Rowles. O'Toole made his professional debut for the Roar on 26 April 2017, in an AFC Champions League group stage game against Muangthong United, coming on as a second-half substitute for Luke DeVere in a 3–0 loss.

O’Toole made his A-League debut on 11 November 2017, seeing out a 1–1 draw with Melbourne Victory at Etihad Stadium. He started and played a full A-League match for the first time the following week, impressing in a 3–1 win over Melbourne City FC at home.

In January 2020, O'Toole left the Roar for fellow A-League side Newcastle Jets. He signed a two-year extension with the Jets in March 2021. Despite this, in July 2021 the club announced that his contract was mutually terminated. The following day Sydney FC announced they had signed O'Toole on a two-year contract.

After a season and a half at Sydney FC, O'Toole had his contract mutually terminated. The following day he joined Western United.

International
O'Toole was first called up to the Australian under-20 side in October 2015, making two appearances in the successful 2016 AFC U-19 Championship qualification tournament. He was later included in the squad for the 2016 AFF U-19 Youth Championship by incoming coach Ufuk Talay in September 2015. Australia went on to win the title, defeating Thailand 5–1 in the final, with O'Toole setting up Keanu Baccus for the first of Australia's goals from a corner. Later that month O'Toole was named in the squad for the 2016 AFC U-19 Championship.

Career statistics

Club
As of 6 May 2022

Honours

International
Australia
 AFF U-19 Youth Championship: 2016

See also
 List of Brisbane Roar FC players

References

External links
 

1997 births
Living people
Association football defenders
Australia under-20 international soccer players
Australian people of Irish descent
Australian people of Japanese descent
Brisbane Roar FC players
Newcastle Jets FC players
Sydney FC players
Western United FC players
Soccer players from Sydney
Australian soccer players